Signs of a Vacant Soul is Virgos Merlot's first and only album. It was released on March 2, 1999 by Atlantic Records. The album's only single, "Gain," had moderate radio play and reached #40 on the U.S. Mainstream Rock chart.
The band later reformed, minus guitarist Marchant, as "Virgos".

The opening track, "The Cycle", has been featured in an episode of The Sopranos, "...To Save Us All from Satan's Power".

Track listing

 "The Cycle" - 3:24
 "Come Apart" - 3:51
 "Winning" - 3:40
 "Gain" - 4:19
 "Wrong" - 3:06
 "Beautiful Lie" - 4:59
 "More" - 2:29
 "Knowing Burns" - 3:41
 "Kiss My Disease" - 4:32
 "Trouble" - 3:33
 "Parasite" - 4:19
 "Disregarding" - 3:45

Credits
 Eric Altenburger - Photography
 J.D. Charlton - Drums, Drums (Electric), Electric Drums
 Joseph Cultice - Photography
 Chris Dickerson - Bass, Vocals (background)
 Jason Elgin - Producer, Engineer, Mixing
 Steve Hall - Mastering
 Brett Hestla - Guitar, Vocals, Lyricist, Producer
 Ted "Deacon" Ledbetter - Guitar, Effects, Guitar Effects
 Jason Marchant - Guitar
 Virgos Merlot - Producer

Singles

References

1999 debut albums
Virgos Merlot albums